Sara Monforte Mestre (born 14 October 1980) is a Spanish retired football midfielder and the current manager of the Villarreal CF's women's team.

Career
Monforte has developed her career in the Valencian Community and Catalonia, having previously played most notably for Levante and Espanyol, with which she won two championships and eight national cups. She also played for Valencia's predecessor Colegio Alemán for one season and later, from 2013 to 2016, before signing with Transportes Alcaine.

International career
Monforte was a member of the Spanish national team for eight years, narrowly missing the 1997 European Championship.

References

1980 births
Living people
Spanish women's footballers
Spain women's international footballers
Primera División (women) players
Levante UD Femenino players
Villarreal CF (women) players
RCD Espanyol Femenino players
Valencia CF Femenino players
Footballers from the Valencian Community
Zaragoza CFF players
Women's association football midfielders
Spanish football managers
Sportspeople from Castellón de la Plana
21st-century Spanish women